The 1991–92 season of the Balkans Cup club tournament was the 26th season of the competition. It was won by Turkish side Sarıyer in the final against Romanian Oțelul Galați for their first title in the competition.

Quarter-finals

|}

First leg

Second leg

Sarıyer won 3–1 on aggregate.

Semi-finals

|}

First leg

Second leg

Oțelul Galați won 4–2 on aggregate.

Sarıyer won 5–3 on aggregate.

Final

First leg

Second leg

Sarıyer won 1–0 on aggregate.

References

1991–92
1991–92 in European football
1991–92 in Albanian football
1991–92 in Bulgarian football
1991–92 in Greek football
1991–92 in Turkish football